The Dagger and the Coin is a series of high fantasy novels by the American writer Daniel Abraham. The first volume of the series, The Dragon's Path, was first published in 2011 and the fifth and final installment, The Spider's War, was released in 2016.

The series is a tale of people coming to power unprepared and what they do as they come of age and learn to wield their new power.  It is also a look into what actually wins wars: military might, "the dagger", or money, "the coin".

Plots

The Dragon's Path 
Sir Geder Palliako is a minor knight in the Imperial Antean Army during the capture of the Free City of Vanai. Eventually, he becomes the Protector of Vanai. As ruler of the city, he causes a famine resulting in a riot that causes Geder to destroy the city. After returning to Camnipol, Geder becomes a hero. This causes him to go on a journey that leads to the discovery of the Cult of the Spider Goddess and the priest, Basrahip.

Cithrin bel Sarcour is the ward of the Medean Bank in Vanai. As the Antean Army approaches Vanai, she is charged with moving the bulk of the bank's assets into the city of Carse. Despite this, she stops in another city called Porte Oliva where she founds her own branch of the bank.

Sir Dawson Kalliam is a noble member of the Antean Court and childhood friend of King Simeon. He discovers and fights against a plot to assassinate Prince Aster, the heir to the Antean throne.

Captain Marcus Wester is a former war hero now looking for other work. Marcus and his men join a caravan leaving Vanai before the siege and end up protecting Cithrin.

Clara Annalise Kalliam is the wife of Dawson Kalliam. She works with Dawson to discover the root of the plot against the prince's life.

Master Kit is the master of a troop of actors performing in Vanai before the Antean Army appears. Kit and his troop join the caravan with Marcus Wester that leaves town prior to the siege.

The King's Blood 
Cithrin bel Sarcour has established a new bank branch in Porte Oliva, but has lost some of her authority. She takes a trip to visit Komme Medean, the owner of the bank. Komme sends Cithrin on another trip, this time to Camnipol where she finds herself in the middle of a civil war.

Dawson Kalliam leads the Antean Army against Asterilhold which had backed the plot against Aster.  After a successful campaign he realizes the amount of influence that the priests of the Spider Goddess have gained. As a noble raised on tradition and history, he finds this unacceptable.

Geder Palliako has successfully helped thwart the plot against prince Aster and helped uncover the Antean nobles that helped. All of that success brings Geder to the attention of the King and he becomes the Regent. However, by taking the advice of Basrahip he has offended the nobility which brings about a civil war.

Marcus Wester is leading the guard at the Medean bank in Porte Oliva. After Cithrin gets sent to Camnipol, Marcus feels she is in danger and decides to leave to see what he can do to help her.

Clara Annalise Kalliam struggles to keep her family in good standing among the nobles in light of the civil war.

Master Kit's former troop find themselves in a position to help Cithrin in the midst of the civil war in Camnipol and he realizes he needs to take action against the cult of the spider goddess.

The Tyrant's Law 
Milo of Order Murro has just reached manhood.  As part of the Haaverkin ritual he learns a secret that only the Order of Murro know.

Clara Annalise Kalliam, Dawson's disgraced widow, is learning to live a new life outside the Antean noble court.  Clara has decided to do what she can to undermine Geder Palliako's rule.

Sir Geder Palliako is the Lord Regent of Imperial Antea and is charged with protecting Prince Aster and running the kingdom until the prince is of age. The civil war headed by Dawson Kalliam has been tamped down. The Antean army takes the war to the Timzinae in an effort to find who was behind the attempt on Prince Aster's life.  Each win on the battle field brings another reason to continue the war as Geder tries to bring peace to the world.  Each victory also spreads the influence of the Spider Goddess's priests.

Citrin bel Sarcour is now serving a year as an apprentice to Magistra Isadau in the Suddapal branch of the Komme Medean Bank.  During this time the bank must prepare for the coming Antean army and Citrin must decide how to respond to romantic overtures from Geder Palliako.

Marcus Wester has joined Master Kit on multiple journeys to search out weapons that may help bring about the downfall of the Cult of the Spider Goddess.

Inys has slept for ages and is awakened to a changed world.

The Widow's House 
Inys has awakened to a world he doesn't remember but may have caused.

Clara Annalise Kalliam continues to work to undermine Geder's rule all while treading a fine line of being loyal to her family and the Severed Throne.

Cithrin bel Sarcour has fled the advances of Geder and the Antean army in Suddapal and is back in Port Oliva. She must decide how to use her knowledge to defeat Geder while cultivating allies.

Geder Palliako is heartbroken that Cithrin has used her influence to undermine his army and his orders. He now orders his army to march on Port Oliva to capture Cithrin.

Marcus Wester has awoken a dragon. He continues his work with Kit to undermine Geder while still employed as a guard of the Medean Bank.

Karol Dannien is ready to take the fight back against the Anteans and march on Camnipol.

The Spider's War 
Ovur is a priest of the spider goddess who has come to a different understanding of truth than Basrahip.

Marcus Wester goes with Clara Kalliam to help the Antean army return to Camnipol.  Upon return to the city, Wester plots an end to the priesthood of the spider goddess.

Cithrin bel Sarcour continues her work for the Medean Bank.  Then she returns to Camnipol to help bring about the downfall of the priests of the spider goddess.

Clara Annalise Kalliam goes with Captain Wester and the Antean army as they return to Camnipol.  She must come to grips with the fact that one of her sons is a priest of the spider goddess and for them to end the war, he must also be killed.

Geder Palliako has a hard time reconciling what the priests are telling him about the success of the war with the reports he is getting back from the field.

Damond Glas works as a guardsman in Borja. They'd heard news of the spider goddess priests and work to keep them from entering the city.

Vicarion Kalliam has been assigned as a priest in Porte Oliva after it fell to the Antean army. He works to reconcile what he sees as truth to that of his friend and fellow priest, Kurrik.

Duris is part of the Antean army garrisoned at Nus to help protect the city from the Timzinae.

The fastest messenger in the kingdom of Antea is sent to the home temple of the spider goddess—Kurrik and the other priests from Porte Oliva head back to Camnipol—Sir Raillien sees the priests out of Asinport—Coppin guards the city of Kavinpol as the priests have recently left.

Inys tends his battle wounds and plots his next steps.

Kit decides what he must do after the last battle with the spider goddess.

Karol Dannien is ready to take the fight back against the Anteans and march on Camnipol.

Point of view chapters

Novel information

References

External links 
 Official Website

Fantasy novel series
High fantasy novels
Orbit Books books